The Republican Party of Labour and Justice (RPTS;) is a socialist political party in Belarus founded by Ivan Antonovich in 1993. The party is considered to be supportive of the government of president Alexander Lukashenko.

Activities 
Key objectives of the RPTC include the development of the Union State of Russia and Belarus and the Eurasian Economic Union.

In Minsk, on 21 September 2013, conference of political parties in Belarus, Russia, Ukraine and Kazakhstan was held. The event participants signed a memorandum of an alliance. Along with Belarus's Republican Party of Labour and Justice, Russia's A Just Russia, Kazakhstan's "Birlik", and The Socialist Party of Ukraine were included. The RPTC calls for recognition of the independence of South Ossetia and Abkhazia.

The party congratulated Nicolas Maduro on his victory in the presidential election in Venezuela.

At the end of 2012, in Vitebsk, it held a charity event for the Republican Party of Labor and Justice, called "Gift of Santa Claus."

Politispolkom, of the Republican Party of Labor and Justice, unanimously declared the results of the referendum on 16 March 2014 in the Crimea legitimate and supported the will of the inhabitants of Sevastopol. The party has also called for the president Lukashenko to accept the results of the referendum.

The party was one of the first to strongly condemn the Belavezha Accords.

At the extraordinary XIII Congress of the Republican Party of Labor and Justice, held on December 12, 2020, Vasily Zadnepryany, who had headed the RPTS since 2006, was expelled from its members. Alexander Alexandrovich Stepanov became the acting chairman of the RPTS.

Electoral performance 
At the Belarusian parliamentary election in 1995, the party obtained 1 out of 198 seats. At the legislative election in 2000, it gained 2 out of 110 seats in the House of Representatives. The following elections in 2004 and 2008 were not successful for the party; however, in 2012, it won one seat.

As a result of elections to the local Councils of Deputies of the Republic of Belarus (2014), 36 people were elected. Two members of the party are members of the Minsk City Council of Deputies.

In the 2019 Belarusian parliamentary election, it won a total of 6 seats to Belarus' House of Representatives.

Presidential elections

Legislative elections

References

External links
 

1993 establishments in Belarus
Democratic socialist parties in Europe
Labour parties
Political parties established in 1993
Political parties in Belarus
Socialist parties in Belarus